Two ships of the Royal Navy have borne the name HMS Dianthus, after the flower:

  was an  sloop launched in 1917 and sold in 1921 becoming the mercantile Guerrero..
  was a  launched in 1940 and sold in 1947 becoming the mercantile Thorslep.

Royal Navy ship names